Maximilien Joseph Schauenburg (born in Saint Stephen's Church on 30 April 1784 and died in Paris on 19 September 1838) was a French officer who participated to the French conquest of Algeria.

Family
Born on 30 April 1784 in Saint Stephen's Church near Strasbourg, he is the son of Alexis Balthazar Henri Schauenburg (1748-1831) and Sophie Louise Albertini d'Ichtersheim.

Before 1825 he married Octavia Françoise Caroline de Berckheim who died in 1827, then he remarried in 1829 with Ursule Hortense Delorme (1799-1871), of whom he had an only son Pierre Maximilien Arthur Schauenburg.

Publications
Maximilien Joseph Schauenburg wrote several contributions in the military field, including:
 Translation from German in 1821 of the work "Tactics of the cavalry" by Count Friedrich Wilhelm von Bismarck (1783–1860).
 "From the Company Squadron" on 12 February 1835 and published in the magazine "Le Spectateur Militaire".
 "Clothing and harness of the light cavalry" on 6 November 1834 and published in the magazine "Le Spectateur Militaire".
 "From the employment of the cavalry to war", Gaultier-Laguionie, 1838, 128 p.

Awards
Maximilien Joseph Schauenburg was decorated with several medals during his military career, including:
 Knight of the Order of Saint Louis.
 Officer of the Legion of Honour.

Gallery

See also
 List of people from Strasbourg
 French conquest of Algeria
 Massacre of El Ouffia (1832)
 Raid on Reghaïa (1837)
 Expedition of the Col des Beni Aïcha (1837)
 First Battle of Boudouaou (1837)
 First Battle of the Issers (1837)

Bibliography

References

1784 births
Military personnel from Strasbourg
1838 deaths
French Army officers
French people of colonial Algeria
1830s in Algeria
Order of Saint Louis recipients
Recipients of the Legion of Honour